Pseudonocardia xishanensis is a Gram-positive and non-motile bacterium from the genus of Pseudonocardia which has been isolated from the roots of the plant Artemisia annua from the Xishan Mountains in China.

References

Pseudonocardia
Bacteria described in 2012